Murray Beach Provincial Park, is a provincial park in the Province of New Brunswick, Canada. Located on Route 955 on the Northumberland Strait near the Little Shemogue River.

See also
List of New Brunswick parks

References

External links

Murray Beach Provincial Park

Provincial parks of New Brunswick
Geography of Westmorland County, New Brunswick
Tourist attractions in Westmorland County, New Brunswick
Beaches of New Brunswick
1959 establishments in New Brunswick